Loricaria coximensis is a species of catfish in the family Loricariidae. It is native to South America, where it occurs in the basin of the Coxim River, for which it is named, near the municipality of São Gabriel do Oeste in the state of Mato Grosso do Sul in Brazil. The gut contents of one individual examined contained only seeds, indicating that the species may be granivorous. The species reaches 9.4 cm (3.7 inches) in standard length and is believed to be a facultative air-breather.

References 

Fish described in 2012
Loricariini